PL, P.L., Pl, or .pl may refer to:

Businesses and organizations

Government and political
 Partit Laburista, a Maltese political party
 Liberal Party (Brazil, 2006), a Brazilian political party
 Liberal Party (Moldova), a Moldovan political party
 Liberal Party (Rwanda), a Rwandan political party
 Parlamentarische Linke, a parliamentary caucus in Germany
 Patriotic League (Bosnia and Herzegovina) (Bosnian: Patriotska Liga), a military organisation of the Republic of Bosnia and Herzegovina
 Philippine Legislature, a legislature that existed in the Philippines from 1907 to 1935
 Progressive Labor Party (United States), a United States communist party

Sports leagues 
 Premier League, the top English association football league
 Pacific League, one of the two leagues in Japan's Nippon Professional Baseball
 Pioneer Baseball League, a Rookie league in Minor League Baseball
 Pioneer Football League, NCAA FCS conference

Other businesses and organizations
 Airstars Airways (IATA airline designator PL, 2000–2011)
 Aeroperú (IATA airline designator PL, 1973–1999)
 Papillion-La Vista Senior High School in Papillion, Nebraska, USA
 Public library, a library maintained by government for public use
 Professional Limited Liability Company, a limited liability company organized for the purpose of providing professional services

Places
 PL postcode area, UK, a group of postcode districts in England
 Poland (ISO 3166-1 country code)

Religion
 PL Kyodan, a religious movement founded in Japan in the early 20th century
 Patrologia Latina, a collection of Catholic writings published by Jacques-Paul Migne between 1841 and 1855

Science, technology, and mathematics

Chemistry
 Pyridoxal, one form of vitamin B6
 Pulchellidin (Pl), an anthocyanidin
Phospholipid, a class of lipids that are a major component of all cell membranes

Computing and telecommunications

File formats 
 .pl, common filename suffix for Perl scripts
 .pl, common filename suffix for Prolog programs
 .pl, common filename suffix for TeX font property lists

Programming

 Programming language
 PL/C, an instructional dialect of the PL/I computer programming language, developed at Cornell University in the 1970s
 PL/I, a computer programming language developed in the 1960s
 PL/SQL, Oracle's procedural language extension (inception in 1995)
 PL/pgSQL, PostgreSQL's procedural language extension (inception 1998)

Telecommunication and networking
 .pl, country code top-level domain for Poland
 PL tone, a kind of squelching of an audio signal
 Packet loss, one of the three main error types encountered in digital communications
 Path loss, in telecommunication engineering
 Presentation layer, one of the seven layers in the OSI model of computer networking
 Digital Private Line, another form of tone squelching

Mathematics
 Piecewise linear (disambiguation), in mathematics
 Propositional logic, a system of evaluating truth-based propositions in terms of binary logic
 PL (complexity), in complexity theory

Other uses in science and technology
 Ice pellets (METAR weather code PL), a form of precipitation
 Picolitre (pL), and petaliter (PL), units of volume
 Pluto, a dwarf planet
 Photoluminescence, the re-emission of photons from a surface following exposure
 Pierre Levasseur (aircraft builder), a French aircraft designer
 Plastic limit, in geotechnical engineering

Other uses
 Platoon leader, in the US Army
 Plural, in grammar
 Polish language (ISO 639-1 code "pl")
 Private label, an arrangement between companies regarding the exclusive sale of goods
 Public law
 Public liability